John Batterson Stetson (May 5, 1830 – February 18, 1906) was an American hatter, hat manufacturer, and in the 1860s, the inventor of the cowboy hat. He founded the John B. Stetson Company as a manufacturer of headwear. The company's hats are now commonly referred to simply as Stetsons.

Stetson was born in New Jersey, the 8th of 12 children. His father, Stephen Stetson, was a hatter. As a youth, John Stetson worked with his father until John was diagnosed with tuberculosis and his doctor predicted he had only a short time to live. Given this, he left the hat-making business to explore the American West, afraid this would be his only chance to see it.  There he met drovers, bullwhackers and cowboys.  The former hat-maker turned a critical eye to the flea-infested coonskin caps favored by many of the gold seekers, and wondered whether fur-felt would work for a lightweight, all-weather hat suitable for the West.

Boss of the Plains
In 1865 — "a time when almost everyone wore hats" — Stetson moved to Philadelphia to enter the hat-making craft he'd learned from his father and began manufacturing hats there suited to the needs of the Westerners. Stetson made a western hat for each hat dealer in the Boss of the Plains style he had invented, during the trek to Pike's Peak.  These lightweight hats were natural in color with four inch crowns and brims; a plain strap was used for the band.

Thanks to the time he had spent with cowboys and Western settlers, Stetson knew firsthand that the headwear they wore (such as coonskin caps, sea captain hats, straw hats, and wool derbies) were impractical. He decided to offer people a better hat. Made from waterproof felt, the new hat was durable. The wide brim would protect people from the hot sun.

Noted one observer, "It kept the sun out of your eyes and off your neck.  It was like an umbrella.  It gave you a bucket (the crown) to water your horse and a cup  (the brim) to water yourself.  It made a hell of a fan, which you need sometimes for a fire but more often to shunt cows this direction or that." Before the invention of the cowboy hat (which means before John B. Stetson came along), the cowpunchers of the plains wore carryovers of previous lives and vocations.

The hat achieved instant popularity and was named the "Boss of the Plains," the first real cowboy hat. Stetson went on to build the Carlsbad, easily identified by its main crease down the front. His hat was called a Stetson, because he had his name John B. Stetson Company embossed in gold in every hatband.  The Stetson soon became the most well known hat in the West.  All the high-crowned, wide-brimmed, soft felt western hats that followed are intimately associated with the cowboy image created by Stetson.

The Stetson Cowboy hat was the symbol of the highest quality. Western icons such as Buffalo Bill Cody, Calamity Jane, Will Rogers, Annie Oakley, Pawnee Bill, Tom Mix, and the Lone Ranger wore Stetsons. The company also made hats for law enforcement departments, such as the Texas Rangers.  Stetson's Western-style hats were worn by employees of the National Park Service, U.S. Cavalry soldiers, and many U.S. Presidents.

The Company
Under Stetson's direction, The John B. Stetson Company became one of the largest hat firms in the world. Stetson hats won numerous awards, but as his company grew, he "faced the challenge of developing a reliable labor force." Reportedly, "people working in the hat trade at that time tended to drift from employer to employer" and "absenteeism was rampant." Stetson, "guided by Baptist religious principles, believed that by providing for his employees he would lend stability to their lives and attract higher caliber ones." Unlike most other employers, Stetson decided to offer benefits to entice workers to stay. Stetson also made sure his employees had a clean, safe place to work, including building a hospital, a park and houses for his 5,000 employees. By 1915, nine years after Stetson's death, 5,400 employees were turning out 3.3 million hats.

Philanthropy
While Stetson profited from his business, he also wanted to give back to his community. Near the end of his life, Stetson began donating almost all of his money to charitable organizations. He built grammar and high schools and helped build colleges, including Temple and Stetson Universities. He also helped establish the YMCA in Philadelphia. Stetson donated generously to the DeLand Academy (in DeLand, Fla.), which was renamed (1889) John B. Stetson University. In 1900, Stetson University founded the first law school in Florida: Stetson University College of Law.

Stetson co-founded Sunday Breakfast Rescue Mission, a homeless shelter and soup kitchen, in 1878.  Sunday Breakfast Rescue Mission has since expanded to provide more services and is still in use for the homeless population of Philadelphia.

Stetson owned a mansion in DeLand where he died in 1906. The over 8,000 ft² structure called John B. Stetson House is a mixture of Gothic, Tudor, and Moorish styles, and is open to the public for tours. Stetson is buried in West Laurel Hill Cemetery, Bala Cynwyd, Pennsylvania.

In popular culture
In Louis Armstrong`s song "St. Jame´s Infirmary", he says he wants to be buried with a "Stetson hat" (because) "John B. there is".

The actor Alan Young, known for his role in the sitcom, Mr. Ed, played Stetson in the 1962 episode "The Hat That Won the West" of the syndicated television series, Death Valley Days, hosted by Stanley Andrews.

The folk song "Stagger Lee", covered by Bob Dylan among others, tells the story of how in a bar-room brawl, "bad man Stagger Lee" shoots Billy Lyons dead for taking Stagger Lee's Stetson Hat.

On his sixth album The Road to Ensenada, released in 1996, singer-songwriter Lyle Lovett is pictured on the cover with his Stetson held over his heart, and the opening song is "Don't Touch My Hat."  It contains the lyrics "My John B. Stetson / Was my only friend / And we've stuck together / Through many a woman."

In the Jimmie Rodgers song, "Mule Skinner Blues", he asks his wife to bring a 'pint of booze and a John B. Stetson hat' back from town.

In the 2017 Colter Wall album named after himself, the song titled "Thirteen Silver Dollars", references the Stetson hat in the lines "Well, I got my health, My John B Stetson...."

References

Further reading
Bender, Texan Bix. (1994) Hats & the cowboys who wear them  
Carlson, Laurie. (1998) Boss of the Plains, the hat that won the West  
Manns, William. (1997) Cowboys & the Trappings of the Old West 
Reynolds, William and Rich Rand. (1995) The Cowboy Hat book  
Snyder, Jeffrey B. (1997) Stetson Hats and the John B. Stetson Company 1865-1970.

External links
 Basic Information
 Biography-West Laurel Hill Cemetery web site
 In search of the real cowboy hat, Cowboy Chronicle April 2004 reprint, accessed online April 1, 2009. 
 https://www.findagrave.com/memorial/12902/john-batterson-stetson

American milliners
Hat companies
Rider apparel
Western wear
Businesspeople from Philadelphia
People from DeLand, Florida
People from Orange, New Jersey
1830 births
1906 deaths
Burials at West Laurel Hill Cemetery
19th-century American businesspeople
People of the American Old West